Skaraborg may refer to the following places:

Skaraborg County, a former county of Sweden
Västergötland, a historical province of Sweden that includes the area of the former county
Västra Götaland County, a current county of Sweden that includes the area of the former county